The 2022 Tim Hortons Brier, Canada's national men's curling championship, was held from March 4 to 13 at the ENMAX Centre in Lethbridge, Alberta. In the final, the defending Olympic bronze medallist Brad Gushue Wild Card #1 team, which also include Mark Nichols, Brett Gallant and Geoff Walker from Newfoundland and Labrador defeated Alberta, skipped by Kevin Koe. It was Gushue's fourth career Brier title, and the team did it shorthanded, as Nichols missed the playoffs due to testing positive for COVID-19. According to Curling Canada, it was the first time a three-player team won a Brier final. Gushue's four Brier wins ties the record with Ernie Richardson, Randy Ferbey, Kevin Martin and Koe for most Brier championships as a skip, and his rink tied the "Ferbey Four" for most Brier championships as a foursome with four titles.  Gushue played as a Wild Card team as they missed the Newfoundland and Labrador provincials due to their participation in the Olympics, and were the first team to ever play at the Brier and the Olympics in the same year. They were also the first Wild Card team to win the Brier. The Gushue rink represented Canada at the 2022 World Men's Curling Championship at the Orleans Arena in Las Vegas, United States, where they won the silver medal.

Summary
Prior to the event, four players tested positive for COVID-19, delaying their arrival to Lethbridge. Unlike the 2021 Brier, which was held in a centralized "bubble" behind closed doors to avoid the spread of COVID-19, testing was only done before the event, and not during the event. The event was also held after the lifting of many pandemic restrictions in Alberta, meaning not only were fans allowed to attend the Brier, they did not have to wear masks.

The event began with the playing of the Ukrainian national anthem before the first draw, as a tribute to the country that is currently being invaded by Russia.

Draw 3 saw 15 year old Nicholas Codner, the alternate on Newfoundland and Labrador, become the youngest ever curler in recorded Brier history when he was subbed in during their game against Alberta, breaking the record set by Manitoba's John Van Hellemond (brother of hockey referee Andy Van Hellemond) who was 16 at the 1958 Brier, and whose participation resulted in the ban of junior curlers at the Brier for nearly 60 years. Draw 3 also featured the "highly-anticipated" match between the defending champion Brendan Bottcher rink, representing Team Canada, and Team New Brunswick. Bottcher's former third, Darren Moulding, had been controversially kicked off the 2021 champion team, and had joined James Grattan, who won the New Brunswick berth. Despite Bottcher's team being from Alberta, fans were more supportive of New Brunswick, as Moulding is from the Lethbridge area. Team Canada ultimately won the game, 6–4.

Draw 10 saw brothers Marc and Glen Kennedy play against each other for the first time at the Brier, with the younger Marc playing for Northern Ontario making his 11th Brier appearance, and the older Glen, playing for the Northwest Territories, making his first appearance. Other family connections at the event include the Northern Ontario front end Harnden brothers E.J. and Ryan (playing for their cousin Brad Jacobs), Saskatchewan front end Marsh brothers Kevin and Daniel, the Koe brothers (Kevin, skip of Team Alberta and Jamie, skip of Northwest Territories), the Gallant brothers (Brett, second for Wild Card #1's Brad Gushue and Christopher, alternate for Prince Edward Island), and the father and son duo of Glenn and Scott Howard, the back end of team Ontario.

Draw 17 saw Ontario's Glenn Howard win his 100th career game as a skip with their win over the Yukon. He is ranked fifth all-time for wins among skips at the Brier.

Team Canada was the first team to secure a playoff spot for the six-team championship round, following their Draw 13 match against Wild Card #2 (skipped by Matt Dunstone). Brad Gushue's Wild Card #1 rink was the second team to secure a playoff spot after defeating Nova Scotia in Draw 14. Team Alberta, skipped by Kevin Koe, became the third team to secure a spot, following their win over Team Canada in Draw 15 in a "battle of Alberta". Following the final draws of pool play, Northern Ontario, skipped by Brad Jacobs clinched a spot in the playoffs after defeating Nova Scotia in their final round robin game. Tie breakers will be necessitated for the final playoff spots in both pools. Team Wild Card #2 lost their final game to Saskatchewan, skipped by Colton Flasch resulting in a re-match between those two teams for the pool A tiebreaker, and Manitoba, skipped by Mike McEwen was forced into a tiebreaker against Wild Card #3, skipped by Jason Gunnlaugson, after McEwen lost their final round robin game to Quebec.

In the Group A tiebreaker, Saskatchewan defeated Wild Card #2 (Dunstone), 9–5 in a re-match of their final round robin game, and the Saskatchewan provincial final, in which Flash won all three.  In the Group B tiebreaker, Jason Gunnlaugson's Wild Card #3 team defeated their provincial rival Mike McEwen rink, representing Manitoba 9–3. With the win, Gunnlaugson advanced to the quarterfinal of the championship round to play Team Canada, while Saskatchewan advanced to play Northern Ontario. Both Alberta and Wild Card #1 (Gushue) advanced directly to the semifinals as a result of finishing first in their groups.

In the semifinals of the championship round, Saskatchewan routed Northern Ontario 10–3 and Team Canada beat Wild Card #3 (Gunnlaugson) 7–3, eliminating both Northern Ontario and Wild Card #3 from the playoffs. In the Saskatchewan–Northern Ontario game, Northern Ontario skip Brad Jacobs and his team conceded after just seven ends, and immediately left the ice in defeat. With the wins, Saskatchewan went on to play Alberta and Team Canada went on to play Wild Card #1 (Gushue) in the championship round finals. Prior to their game against Team Canada, Wild Card #1's third Mark Nichols tested positive for COVID-19, and announced he would not play for the rest of the tournament, leaving the team shorthanded with just three players, as they did not bring an alternate player to the event. Nichols began feeling unwell the night before, and continue to feel unwell the next day, experiencing "mild symptoms". The rest of the team tested negative. In the championship round finals, Team Canada beat Wild Card #1 4–3, while Alberta edged Saskatchewan 7–2. This sent Team Canada and Alberta to the 1 vs. 2 game in the page playoff round, and sent Saskatchewan and Wild Card #1 into the 3 vs. 4 game.

In the page playoff 3 vs. 4 game, Brad Gushue's shorthanded Wild Card #1 rink took on Saskatchewan, skipped by Colton Flasch. Gushue, who started the game with the hammer opened the scoring in the second end, by making a soft raise takeout for two. Flasch responded with a hit for two in the third to tie the game, and forced Gushue to one in the fourth, with Gushue drawing through a narrow port against three. In the fifth end, Saskatchewan took a 4–3 lead after Flasch made an in-off to score two. Gushue scored two in the sixth, and forced Flasch to one in the seventh. Back with the hammer, Gushue was forced to a single of his own in the eighth, after making an in-off to take a 6–5 lead. Flasch capitalized in the ninth end by scoring two more points after making a soft tap. In the final end, Gushue successfully made an angle-run back to score three points on his last rock, giving his Wild Card #1 team a 9–7 win. After the game, Gushue compared playing with just three players (third Nichols did not play due to testing positive for COVID-19) as "killing a penalty for 60 minutes (in a hockey game)". Flasch called the match a "great game" due to the shot making of both teams. The win put Gushue into the page playoff semifinal against the loser of the 1 vs. 2 game, and eliminated Saskatchewan from contention.

In the 1 vs. 2 page playoff game, Alberta, skipped by Kevin Koe, took on the defending champion Team Canada rink, skipped by Brendan Bottcher. Trailing 5–6 in the seventh end without the hammer, Bottcher missed a key triple takeout attempt, allowing Koe to score two, to go up 8–5. After the teams traded singles in the eighth and ninth ends, Koe ran Bottcher out of rocks in the 10th, giving Bottcher a single point, and beating him for a final score of 9–7. Compared to the 3 vs. 4 game, the 1 vs. 2 match was considered "definitely not a classic" by Koe, who stated the "ice got a little trickier". The win put Alberta directly in to the Brier final, and bumped Team Canada into a semifinal showdown against Brad Gushue's Wild Card #1 rink.

Brad Gushue's Wild Card #1 rink continued to roll in the semifinal, despite playing with just three players, beating Team Canada 9–3. Defence played a role early in the game, with both teams trading singles in the first two ends, and blanking the third. In the fourth, Gushue made a draw under a centre guard, forcing Bottcher to make a tap for a single to take a 2–1 lead. Bottcher was wide with a runback attempt in the fifth, allowing Gushue to draw for three. In the sixth, Bottcher was forced to take a single, after his first stone picked, but made a run back double-takeout to score one point. Bottcher came up light with hist last shot in the seventh end, allowing Gushue to draw to score another three points. Gushue stole two more points in the eighth before Team Bottcher conceded the game. The win advanced Gushue to the final to play Alberta, skipped by Kevin Koe.

The final between Koe's Alberta rink and Gushue's Wild Card team started as a struggle for both teams. Gushue's normal second Brett Gallant, who was throwing stones four through six on the still shorthanded team, flashed a hit in the second end, leading to a score of two for Alberta. Alberta third B. J. Neufeld rubbed on guards on both of his shots, which led to a three-ender for Gushue in the third. After a blank end, Koe made a tap for two to take a 4–3 lead after five ends. In the sixth end, Koe missed on a triple takeout attempt, hitting just one rock, which led to a Gushue draw for three to take a 6–4 lead. In the seventh, Gushue failed to bury his rock on a hit-and-roll attempt, allowing Koe a hit for two to tie the game. Koe forced Gushue to a single in eight, but Gushue responded with a steal of one in the ninth after Koe came up short on a draw, to go up 8–6. In the tenth end, following a successful raise takeout by Gushue, Koe could only hit for two on his last shot to tie the game, forcing an extra end without hammer. In the extra end, Gushue had a hit and stay against two to win the game, and his fourth career Brier. It was the last Brier for the Koe rink, as they plan on breaking up after the season.

Teams

Source:

CTRS ranking

Source:

Wild card selection
Curling Canada included three wild card teams, continuing a process started with the 2021 Brier. The teamsskipped by Brad Gushue (Newfoundland and Labrador), Matt Dunstone (Saskatchewan) and Jason Gunnlaugson (Manitoba)were the top three in the Canadian Team Ranking System standings who had not otherwise qualified by winning their provincial championship nor by being the reigning Team Canada champion.

Round robin standings
Final Round Robin Standings

Round robin results

All draw times are listed in Mountain Time (UTC−07:00).

Draw 1
Friday, March 4, 6:30 pm

Draw 2
Saturday, March 5, 1:30 pm

Draw 3
Saturday, March 5, 6:30 pm

Draw 4
Sunday, March 6, 8:30 am

Draw 5
Sunday, March 6, 1:30 pm

Draw 6
Sunday, March 6, 6:30 pm

Draw 7
Monday, March 7, 8:30 am

Draw 8
Monday, March 7, 1:30 pm

Draw 9
Monday, March 7, 6:30 pm

Draw 10
Tuesday, March 8, 8:30 am

Draw 11
Tuesday, March 8, 1:30 pm

Draw 12
Tuesday, March 8, 6:30 pm

Draw 13
Wednesday, March 9, 8:30 am

Draw 14
Wednesday, March 9, 1:30 pm

Draw 15
Wednesday, March 9, 6:30 pm

Draw 16
Thursday, March 10, 8:30 am

Draw 17
Thursday, March 10, 12:30 pm

Draw 18
Thursday, March 10, 6:30 pm

Tiebreakers
Friday, March 11, 8:30 am

Championship round
The winners of the Finals advance to the 1 vs. 2 game in the Page playoff, while the losers play in the 3 vs. 4 game.

Semifinals
Friday, March 11, 12:30 pm

Finals
Friday, March 11, 6:30 pm

Playoffs

1 vs. 2
Saturday, March 12, 6:30 pm

3 vs. 4
Saturday, March 12, 1:30 pm

Semifinal
Sunday, March 13, 11:00 am

Final
Sunday, March 13, 6:00 pm

Statistics

Top 5 player percentages
Final Round Robin Percentages; minimum 6 games

Perfect games
Round robin and championship round only; minimum 10 shots thrown

Awards
The awards and all-star teams are listed as follows:
All-Star Teams
First Team
Skip:  Brad Gushue, Team Wild Card 1
Third:  Marc Kennedy, Northern Ontario
Second:  Kevin Marsh, Saskatchewan
Lead:  Karrick Martin, Team Canada

Second Team
Skip:  Kevin Koe, Alberta
Third:  Mark Nichols, Team Wild Card 1
Second:  John Morris, Alberta
Lead:  Ben Hebert, Alberta

Ross Harstone Sportsmanship Award
 Scott Saccary, third, Nova Scotia

Paul McLean Award
Phil LaPlante, TSN technical producer

Hec Gervais Most Valuable Player Award 
 Brad Gushue, skip, Team Wild Card 1

Notes

References

External links

 
Brier
Curling in Alberta
Brier
Brier
Sport in Lethbridge
The Brier